Mary Datchelor School was an endowed grammar school for girls on Camberwell Grove in Camberwell, Greater London, England. It was established in 1877 and closed in 1981. It was known for its innovations in encouraging teacher training, and for its encouragement of music.

History 

Mary Datchelor School was founded out of an endowment originally intended for the upkeep of the 18th-century Datchelor family's family tomb. A board of trustees was established in 1871, with £20,000 to found a girls' school. The school opened in 1877 with thirty girls, and had grown to over 400 by 1900. The first headmistress was Caroline Rigg (1852-1929), who remained in the job for four decades, until 1917.

Rigg had been professionally trained as a teacher, and encouraged professional training for her staff. From 1879 she began selecting pupils to train herself as teachers. As demand grew, senior girls were awarded 'student-teacherships' to proceed to Maria Grey Training College for further training. In 1888, Rigg persuaded the school trustees to establish a teacher training college, the Datchelor Training College, associated with the school. Rigg herself was college principal, with an additional mistress of method and lecturer in educational science. In 1899 the Cambridge training syndicate granted the college recognition, and the Board of Education inspected and recognized the college in 1902. In 1905 the college became part of the University of London. The training college had two departments: one trained students for the Cambridge Higher Locals and subsequently the London BA, and the other trained students for the Cambridge or London teaching diploma.

From 1918 to 1950, the headmistress was Dorothy Brock:

In the early twentieth century the school was "one of the key centres for developing the music curriculum in secondary schools". From 1919, the school was funded to provide girls with a two-year course of post-GCE music study. Most took up music professionally, some entering teaching.

Brock oversaw the school's evacuation during World War II, first to Kent and then to Llanelli. She was succeeded as headmistress by Rachel N. Pearse. In 1981, the school closed, rather than become either a comprehensive or a private school. The building subsequently became the headquarters of Save the Children for several years, and was converted into a complex of apartments, called Mary Datchelor House, by Berkeley Homes in 2009.

Notable alumnae

Notable staff 
 Dorothy Brock, former headmistress

References

Further reading 

 Rachel N. Pearse, ed., The Story of the Mary Datchelor School, 1877-1957. London: Hodder and Stoughton, 1957. Second, enlarged, ed. 1977.

Camberwell
Grammar schools in London
Girls' schools in London
Defunct schools in the London Borough of Southwark
Defunct grammar schools in England
Defunct girls' schools in the United Kingdom
Educational institutions established in 1877
1877 establishments in England
Educational institutions disestablished in 1981
1981 disestablishments in England